This is a list of deputies elected to the Syrian parliament of 1961. The Syrian parliamentary election was held on 1—2 December 1961. There are no official records, but the number of eligible voters was estimated at between 1,000,000 and 1,250,000. More than 1,800 candidates, among them 11 women, contested for the 172-seat constitutional assembly. Participation in the various constituencies varied between 48—84%, "a figure not reached in Syria before."

Members

Damascus Province
Damascus Province had eight constituencies and was allocated 33 seats: Damascus (17 seats, 3 reserved for non-Muslims), Al-Ghouta (3 seats), Duma (4 seats), Al-Nabk (2 seats), Al-Qutaifah (1 seat), Al-Zabadani (1 seat), Al-Qunaitra (3 seats) and Qatana (2 seats).

Daraa Province
Daraa Province had two constituencies and was allocated 7 seats: Daraa (3 seats) and Izra' (4 seats).

Suweida Province
Suweida Province had three constituencies and was allocated 4 seats: Sweida (2 seats), Salkhad (1 seat) and Shahba (1 seat).

Homs Province
Homs Province had four constituencies and was allocated 16 seats: Homs (11 seats, 1 reserved for non-Muslims), Jubb al-Jarrah (1 seat), Tadmur (1 seat) and Talkalakh (3 seats, 1 reserved for non-Muslims).

Hama Province
Hama Province had four constituencies and was allocated 13 seats: Hama (7 seats), Salamiyah (2 seats), Saan al-Sain (1 seat) and Masyaf (3 seats).

Hasakah Province
Hasakah Province had five constituencies and was allocated 11 seats: Hasakah (4 seats, 1 reserved for non-Muslims), Shedada (1 seat), Qamishli (4 seats, 1 reserved for non-Muslims), Al-Malakiya Dayrik (1 seat) and Ras al-Ayn (1 seat).

Deir ez-Zor Province
Deir ez-Zor Province had three constituencies and was allocated 9 seats: Deir ez-Zor (5 seats), Mayadin (2 seats) and Abu Kamal (2 seats).

Rashid Province
Rashid Province had two constituencies and was allocated 4 seats: Raqqa (3 seats) and Tall Abiad (1 seat).

Aleppo Province
Aleppo Province had eight constituencies and was allocated 36 seats: Aleppo (16 seats, 5 reserved for non-Muslims), Jabal Samaan (5 seats), Al-Bab (3 seats), Ayn al-Arab (2 seats), Manbij (3 seats), Afrin (3 seats), Azaz (3 seats) and Jarablus (1 seat).

Idlib Province
Idlib Province had five constituencies and was allocated 11 seats: Idlib City (2 seats), Idlib (3 seats), Jisr ash-Shughur (2 seats), Maarrat al-Numan (2 seats) and Harem (2 seats).

Latakia Province
Latakia Province had eight constituencies and was allocated 20 seats: Latakia City (3 seats, 1 reserved for non-Muslims), Latakia (2 seats), Al-Haffah (2 seats), Jableh (1 seat), Nabi Ali (3 seats), Banias (2 seats), Tartus (3 seats) and Safita (4 seats, 1 reserved for non-Muslims).

Bedouin Tribes
The Bedouin tribes were allocated 7 seats.

See also
Parliament of Syria
Elections in Syria
Politics of Syria

References

Bibliography

 1961
Parliament, members, 1961
 Parl